Miriam A. Glucksmann FBA is a British sociologist and academic, emeritus professor of sociology at the University of Essex, and visiting professor of sociology at the London School of Economics.

Early life
She studied at the London School of Economics.

Selected publications
Structuralist Analysis in Contemporary Social Thought (1974) Routledge, London
Women on the Line (1982) Routledge, London
Women Assemble: Women Workers and the 'New Industries' in Inter-war Britain (1990) Routledge, London
Cottons and Casuals: the Gendered Organisation of Labour in Time and Space (2000) Sociologypress, Durham
A New Sociology of Work? (2006) Blackwell Publishing, Eds. L. Pettinger, J. Parry, R. Taylor and M. Glucksmann

References

External links 

 WorldCat library catalog

Living people
Academics of the University of Essex
Academics of the London School of Economics
Alumni of the London School of Economics
Fellows of the British Academy
Year of birth missing (living people)